Benjamin Schiff Platt (born September 24, 1993) is an American actor, singer, and songwriter. He began his acting career in musical theater as a child and appeared in productions of The Sound of Music (2006) and The Book of Mormon (2012–2015), rising to prominence for originating the title role in Broadway coming-of-age musical Dear Evan Hansen (2015–2017). His performance in the latter earned him multiple accolades, including a Tony, Emmy, and Grammy Award. At  age 23, Platt became the youngest solo recipient of the Tony Award for Best Actor in a Leading Role in a Musical for his performance in Dear Evan Hansen. Platt reprised the role of Evan Hansen in the 2021 film adaptation of the musical, produced by his father.

Platt's film credits include the Pitch Perfect film series, Ricki and the Flash (2015), and Run This Town (2019). Since 2019, he has starred in the Netflix comedy-drama series The Politician, for which he was nominated for the Golden Globe Award for Best Actor – Television Series Musical or Comedy.

In 2017, Platt was included on the annual Time 100 list of the most influential people in the world.

Platt signed with Atlantic Records in 2017 and released his debut studio album Sing to Me Instead in March 2019. In May 2020, the concert film Ben Platt Live from Radio City Music Hall debuted on Netflix. Platt's second studio album Reverie was released on August 13, 2021.

Early life
Platt was born in Los Angeles, the fourth of five children of Julie (née Beren) and Marc Platt. His father is a film, television, and theater producer whose credits include Legally Blonde, Into the Woods, La La Land, Mary Poppins Returns, and the musical Wicked. He has two sisters and two brothers, including actor Jonah Platt. He and his family are Jewish.

He attended the Adderley School for Performing Arts in Pacific Palisades, performing in productions like Bye Bye Birdie and Into the Woods. Platt attended Harvard-Westlake School in Los Angeles, graduating in 2011. He then enrolled at Columbia University in New York but dropped out after seven weeks to fulfill his contract with The Book of Mormon. During his time at Columbia, he was a member of the campus a cappella musical group Nonsequitur.

Career

2002–2014: Early stage and The Book of Mormon
At 9 years old, Platt played Winthrop Paroo in The Music Man at the Hollywood Bowl alongside Kristin Chenoweth. At 11, he appeared in a brief national tour of Caroline, or Change, by Jeanine Tesori and Tony Kushner. At 17, he played Jean Valjean in Kidz Theater's production of Les Misérables. His other early roles include the role of Claude Bukowski in Columbia University's production of Hair: The American Tribal Love-Rock Musical. He has also collaborated on a workshop of Alice by Heart, by Duncan Sheik and Steven Sater, a new take on Alice in Wonderland.

In 2012, Platt was cast as Elder Arnold Cunningham in the Chicago production of The Book of Mormon. The show premiered at the Bank of America Theatre on December 19, 2012, after a week of previews. The production was well received and closed on October 6, 2013. Critics lauded Platt's performance, calling him a "true revelation in this brand new Chicago production... He really leans into this part, throwing himself out there with the abandonment of youth". Platt later reprised his role as Elder Cunningham on Broadway at the Eugene O'Neill Theatre from January 7, 2014, to January 6, 2015.

2015–2017: Film work and Dear Evan Hansen
In 2012, Platt had a supporting role in the musical comedy Pitch Perfect, loosely based on the non-fiction book Pitch Perfect: The Quest for Collegiate A Cappella Glory. Platt played the magic-loving Benji Applebaum, alongside an ensemble cast comprising Anna Kendrick, Skylar Astin, Rebel Wilson, Adam DeVine, Anna Camp, and Brittany Snow. The film emerged as a major commercial success and received mostly positive reviews from critics. He was subsequently nominated for a Teen Choice Award in the category Choice Movie: Male Scene Stealer for his work. In 2015, Platt reprised his role as Benji Applebaum in the sequel, Pitch Perfect 2, followed by appearances in the films Ricki and the Flash and Billy Lynn's Long Halftime Walk.

Platt became attached to Steven Levenson and Pasek and Paul's then Untitled P&P Project in 2014, participating in early read-throughs and workshops. By 2015, the musical, titled Dear Evan Hansen, had begun production in Washington, D.C. at the Arena Stage with Platt originating the titular role. The show premiered on July 9, 2015, and closed August 23, 2015. The overwhelming positive reception toward the production and Platt's performance resulted in the show being transferred to Off-Broadway.

In 2016, Platt once again originated the role of Evan Hansen at Second Stage Theatre. Platt and the cast played a month of previews, beginning on March 26, 2016, before premiering on May 1, 2016. The limited engagement sold out its entire run with Platt playing his last performance on May 26, 2016.

In December 2016, Platt originated the title role in Dear Evan Hansen on Broadway at the Music Box Theatre. Critics hailed his work, calling it "historic" and "one of the greatest leading male performances [I've] ever seen in a musical". For his performance, 23-year-old Platt won numerous awards including the Tony Award for Best Actor in a Leading Role in a Musical, becoming the youngest solo winner in the category. Platt played his final performance on November 19, 2017.

2017–2020: Debut album and The Politician
In 2017, Platt signed a record deal with Atlantic Records. On January 28, 2018, he performed Leonard Bernstein's "Somewhere" live at the 60th Annual Grammy Awards accompanied by Justin Goldner and Adele Stein and arranged by Alex Lacamoire.

On March 19, 2018, Platt and Hamilton creator Lin-Manuel Miranda released "Found/Tonight", a mashup of the Hamilton song "The Story of Tonight" and the Dear Evan Hansen song "You Will Be Found". Platt donated a portion of the proceeds to support the March for Our Lives anti-gun-violence initiative, and also performed on stage with Miranda at the rally in Washington, D.C., on March 24, 2018. Platt starred opposite Damian Lewis, Nina Dobrev, and Mena Massoud in the Rob Ford historical fiction thriller Run This Town. The casting of Platt caused minor controversy, over allegations that the filmmakers were appropriating the story of female reporter Robyn Doolittle. On March 1, 2018, Platt was confirmed to star in the indie drama Broken Diamonds opposite Lola Kirke, Yvette Nicole Brown, Alphonso McAuley, and Lynda Boyd. The film premiered at the Santa Barbara International Film Festival on April 1, 2021, and was released in the United States on July 23, 2021.

In January 2019, Platt announced that his debut studio album Sing to Me Instead was scheduled for release on March 29, 2019. It was made available for pre-order, along with the songs "Bad Habit" and "Ease My Mind" a few days later. Following the release of his debut album, Platt embarked on his first North American tour in May 2019. The tour ended on September 29, 2019, at Radio City Music Hall in New York City, in which the concert there was taped for release on Netflix. Platt released a new single "Rain" on August 23, 2019, followed by a music video on September 10, 2019. On April 21, 2020, Platt revealed on Instagram that the taping of his Radio City concert, in the form of a TV special entitled Ben Platt Live from Radio City Music Hall, would be released on Netflix on May 20, 2020.

On August 29, 2019, it was announced that Platt would be starring in Richard Linklater's film adaptation of Merrily We Roll Along alongside Beanie Feldstein and Blake Jenner. The project is set to be shot over the course of twenty years, with principal photography of the first sequence of the film having already been completed prior to the announcement. On January 10, 2023, it was announced that Jenner would be replaced by Paul Mescal. 

Platt currently stars as Payton Hobart on the Netflix comedy-drama series The Politician, which tells the story of a very driven teen convinced that he's destined to become President of the United States. Platt's casting was announced in March 2018, and the series premiered on September 27, 2019. He received a Golden Globe Award nomination for Best Actor – Television Series Musical or Comedy for his performance in the series' first season.

Platt released a new single, "So Will I", on May 8, 2020. On May 20, 2020, Platt released Sing to Me Instead (Deluxe), which includes "So Will I", "Rain", and six songs recorded live at Radio City Music Hall, including cover versions of Brandi Carlile's "The Joke" and Elton John's "Take Me to the Pilot". On June 8, 2020, Platt released "Everything I Did to Get to You", a new single written by David Davis, which he picked as the winner of his episode of NBC's songwriting competition show Songland.

2021-present: Reverie and other projects
In April 2021, Platt teased the chorus of his new single, "Imagine", on TikTok. The complete song was released on April 23, 2021, followed by a remix by Dutch electronic producer Tiësto on May 28, 2021. In July, he announced on Twitter that his second studio album, Reverie, for which "Imagine" was released as its first single, will be released on August 13, 2021. Its second single, "Happy to Be Sad", was released on July 16, 2021. The “Reverie” tour was announced on August 13, 2021, spanning 27 stops in North America beginning February 23, 2022 and concluding at the Hollywood Bowl on April 8, 2022. The tour was later postponed due to the COVID pandemic and rescheduled to begin on September 3, 2022, in Seattle, Washington before concluding in Hollywood, Florida on October 7, 2022, for a total of 20 stops.

On June 25, 2021, Platt released a cover version of the song "Yoü and I" by Lady Gaga, as part of the tenth anniversary of the Born This Way album.

On November 29, 2018, it was announced that Universal Pictures and Platt's father, Marc Platt, secured the film rights to Dear Evan Hansen. On June 18, 2020, Platt confirmed that he was set to reprise his role as Evan Hansen in the film, which would be directed by Stephen Chbosky from a screenplay by Levenson. It premiered as the Opening Night Gala Presentation of the 2021 Toronto International Film Festival on September 9, 2021, followed by a release in theaters on September 24, 2021, in time for Platt's 28th birthday. Upon the release of the film's first trailer on May 18, 2021, the casting of Platt as Evan Hansen and the appearance of the film's version of the character received substantial criticism, with viewers commenting that he, at age 27, was too old to play a high schooler. Platt, however, dismissed the response, comparing his age to those of actors who played high school students in the 1978 film Grease. On August 8, 2021, the criticism against the casting went even further, with emerging claims that nepotism was involved in the decision. In an interview with Zach Sang on his YouTube talk show, Platt said "I think the reaction is largely from people who don’t understand the context of the piece — the fact that I created the role and workshopped it for three years ... Were I not to do the movie, it probably wouldn’t get made. And so, I think, my defensive response is to want to go onto Twitter and be like, 'F you, guys. You don’t even know that this wouldn’t exist without me.' Of course, that's not true entirely and not my place to say. All I have to do is let the work speak for itself." His on-screen performance, as well as the film itself, received a negative reception from critics upon release, leading him to a nomination for Worst Actor at the 42nd Golden Raspberry Awards in 2022.

On March 2, 2021, it was announced that Platt was in talks to star in the film adaptation of Grant Ginder's novel The People We Hate at the Wedding. His casting was announced on July 8, 2021, along with Amazon Studios being confirmed to produce the film. The film began production in September 2021 and was released worldwide on streaming platform Amazon Prime on November 18, 2022 .

On May 17, 2022, it was announced that Platt would play Leo Frank in New York City Center's production of Parade as the gala production of its 2022/2023 season after playing the role in a workshop conducted by Roundabout Theatre Company in 2018. Performances ran from November 1 to November 6, 2022 and critics responded positively to Platt’s return to the theatre stage. A limited Broadway run was announced on January 10, 2023, with Platt continuing his role as Leo Frank. The revival began previews on February 22, 2023 and opened on March 16, 2023 at the Bernard B. Jacobs Theatre. The limited run is scheduled to conclude on August 6, 2023. High demand for tickets on the first day of sale resulted in temporarily crashing the Telecharge ticket site, resulting in error messages and queues of an hour long. On the night of the show's first preview, members of the neo-Nazi group National Socialist Movement protested against the production outside the theater.

On June 9, 2022, it was announced that Platt would produce and star in the musical comedy film Theater Camp, inspired by the 2020 short film of the same name co-written with Noah Galvin, Molly Gordon, and Nick Lieberman. The film had its world premiere at the 2023 Sundance Film Festival on January 21, 2023, and was acquired shortly after by Searchlight Pictures for a theatrical release on July 14, 2023.

On August 31, 2022, prior to kicking off the Reverie Tour, Platt confirmed that he was working on new solo music and was a third of the way through completing his next album.

Personal life
Platt is openly gay. He told his family when he was thirteen years old, and publicly came out in 2019, before the release of his song "Ease My Mind". On January 12, 2020, Platt began a relationship with Noah Galvin (who succeeded him in the titular role in Dear Evan Hansen). They announced their engagement on November 25, 2022.

Acting credits

Theatre

Film

Television
{| class="wikitable sortable"
|-
! Year 
! Title
! Role
! Notes
|-
| 
| Will & Grace
| Blake
| Episode: "Who's Your Daddy"
|-
| 2019–2020
| The Politician
| Payton Hobart
| Lead role (15 episodes); also executive producer
|-
| 2020
| Songland
| Himself
| Episode: "Ben Platt"
|-
| 2020
| Graduate Together: America Honors the High School Class of 2020
| Himself
| TV special
|-
| 2020
| The Simpsons
| Blake (voice)
| Episode: "Three Dreams Denied"
|-
| 2020
| The Disney Family Singalong: Volume II
| Himself
| TV special
|-
| 2021
| Big Brother 23
| Himself
| Episode: "Episode 24"
|-
| 2021
| The Tony Awards Present: Broadway's Back!
| Himself
| TV Special
|-
| 2021
| The Premise
| Ethan Streiber
| Episode: "Social Justice Sex Tape"
|-
| 2022
| RuPaul's Drag Race All Stars
| Himself
| Guest judge; Season 7Episode: "Dance Like Drag Queen"
|-
| 2023
| The Other Two
| TBA
| TBA
|}

Discography

Studio albums

Soundtrack and cast albums

Singles

Promotional singles

Other charted and certified songs

Notes

Tours
 Sing to Me Instead Tour (2019)
 Reverie Tour (2022)

Awards

Platt was nominated for an Outer Critics Circle Award, a Drama League Distinguished Performance Award, and won the Obie Award for Distinguished Performance by an Actor and Lucille Lortel Award for Outstanding Lead Actor in a Musical for Dear Evan Hansen's Off-Broadway run in 2016.

On May 19, 2017, at the 83rd annual Drama League Awards, it was announced that Platt had won the organization's Distinguished Performance Award. This award, which recognizes a performance on the New York stage in the past year, can only be won once in a performer's career. In winning at the age of 23, for his work in Dear Evan Hansen'', Platt became the youngest winner in the award's history. On June 11, at the 71st Tony Awards, 23-year-old Platt won the Tony Award for Best Actor in a Leading Role in a Musical becoming the youngest actor to win this award solo.

See also
LGBT culture in New York City
List of EGOT winners – People who have won Emmy, Grammy, Oscar and Tony Awards

Notes

References

External links
 
 
 

1993 births
21st-century American male actors
21st-century American male singers
21st-century American singers
American male child actors
American male film actors
American male musical theatre actors
American male stage actors
American male television actors
American male voice actors
Atlantic Records artists
Daytime Emmy Award winners
American gay actors
American gay musicians
Audiobook narrators
Grammy Award winners
Harvard-Westlake School alumni
Jewish American male actors
Jewish singers
LGBT Jews
LGBT people from California
Living people
Male actors from Los Angeles
Obie Award recipients
Singers from Los Angeles
Songwriters from California
Tony Award winners
20th-century LGBT people
21st-century LGBT people
21st-century American Jews
American male songwriters
Columbia University School of General Studies alumni